Acarsaid or An Acarsaid is a common toponym in the Scottish Highlands. It means literally "anchorage" or "harbour" in Scottish Gaelic, and comes from the Old Norse akkarsaeti, meaning literally "anchor-seat".

References

External links

Scottish toponymy